Georgios Vagiannidis (born 12 September 2001) is a Greek professional footballer who plays as a right-back for Super League club Panathinaikos.

Club career

Panathinaikos
Vagiannidis plays mainly as a right-back and joined Panathinaikos from the team's youth ranks. On 16 February 2020, Vagiannidis made his professional debut and scored his first goal, dishing out an assist as his team breezed past Panetolikos 3–1 at the Olympic Stadium. On mid May 2020, Italian giants Inter have expressed official interest in acquiring the talented young player of Panathinaikos. The 18-year-old right-back had recently reached a verbal agreement with Panathinaikos to sign a new contract, but talks came to a halt due to the coronavirus pandemic.

Inter Milan
On 5 June 2020, Vagiannidis has penned a four-year contract with Inter of Serie A. Inter will not need to negotiate with Panathinaikos to land Vagiannidis and will only have to pay a FIFA determined compensation amount of €400,000. The Greek full-back will reportedly earn around €300,000 per year in Milan.

Loan to Sint-Truiden
On 1 October 2020, Vagiannidis signed with Sint-Truiden on loan. On 3 February 2021, he made his debut with the new club in Belgian Cup against Lokeren-Temse at the Daknamstadion in the season 2020–21.

Return to Panathinaikos
On 3 September 2021, Panathinaikos officially announced the return of George Vagiannidis, who signed on a free transfer, a four-year contract with the club for an undisclosed fee.

Career statistics

Club

Honours
Panathinaikos
Greek Cup: 2021–22

References

External links

2001 births
Living people
Greece youth international footballers
Greek expatriate footballers
Panathinaikos F.C. players
Panathinaikos F.C. B players
Inter Milan players
Sint-Truidense V.V. players
Super League Greece players
Serie A players
Belgian Pro League players
Super League Greece 2 players
Association football defenders
Footballers from Athens
Greek footballers
Expatriate footballers in Italy
Greek expatriate sportspeople in Italy
Expatriate footballers in Belgium
Greek expatriate sportspeople in Belgium